The Game & Watch brand ( Gēmu & Uotchi; called Tricotronic in West Germany and Austria, abbreviated as G&W) is a series of handheld electronic games developed, manufactured, released, and marketed by Nintendo from 1980 to 1991. Created by game designer Gunpei Yokoi, the product derived its name from it featuring a single game as well as a clock on an LCD screen. The models from 1981 onwards featured an alarm in addition.

The series sold a combined 43.4 million units worldwide, including  units in Japan and  overseas. It was the earliest Nintendo video game product to gain major worldwide success.

The units are based on a 4-bit CPU from the Sharp SM5xx family that include a small ROM and RAM area and an LCD screen driver circuit.

Origin and design

Game designer Gunpei Yokoi had been head of Nintendo's Research & Development division in the 1970s, designing physical toys and games until the 1973 oil crisis, after which the market waned for these products. At the same time, the first arcade and home video game consoles had been developed in the United States, and Nintendo had quickly caught onto this wave in Japan. While traveling on a Shinkansen (bullet train), Yokoi saw a bored businessman playing with an LCD calculator by pressing the buttons. Yokoi then thought of an idea for a watch that doubled as a miniature game machine for killing time. Later, he had been able to pitch the idea to Nintendo's president, Hiroshi Yamauchi, when Yamauchi requested him to chauffeur him to a business meeting. Though Yamauchi had not said anything during the drive, the meeting he was at included the CEO of Sharp Corporation, and the two discussed Yokoi's idea. Within the week, Yokoi was invited to a meeting between Nintendo and Sharp, giving him the go-ahead to develop his concept.

Yokoi designed the controls for this portable system based on the success of Nintendo's arcade game Donkey Kong incorporating a single button along with a d-pad for movement. This led up to the creation of Ball, which became one of Nintendo's first major hits.  After its success, multiple variations of the console were released and developed, and was also the main inspiration for the Game Boy, a console Yokoi later created.  The series was discontinued in 1991 with the console "Mario the Juggler".

The units use LR4x/SR4x "button-cell" batteries, which Yokoi opted for because they were small and inexpensive. Different models were manufactured, with some having two screens and a clamshell design (the Multi Screen Series). The Game Boy Advance SP, Nintendo DS, and Nintendo 3DS later reused this design.

Titles available in Game & Watch form vary from Mickey Mouse to Balloon Fight, including Nintendo staples such as Donkey Kong, The Legend of Zelda, and Mario Bros..

The modern "cross" D-pad design was developed in 1982 by Yokoi for the Donkey Kong handheld game. The design proved to be popular for subsequent Game & Watch titles. This particular design was patented and later earned a Technology & Engineering Emmy Award.

Game A and Game B
Most of the titles have a "GAME A" and a "GAME B" button. Game B is generally a faster, more difficult version of Game A, although exceptions do exist:
 In Squish, Game B is radically different from Game A—the player must touch aliens to eliminate them as opposed to avoiding moving walls.
 In Flagman, Game B is a mode where the player has to press the right button within a certain amount of time, not memorize patterns.
 In Judge, Boxing, Donkey Kong 3, and Donkey Kong Hockey, Game B is a two-player version of Game A.
 In Climber, Balloon Fight, and Super Mario Bros., there is no Game B button.
In most cases, both Game A and Game B would increase in speed and/or difficulty as the player progressed, with Game B starting at the level that Game A would reach at 200 points.

Series

 Silver (1980)
 Gold (1981)
 Wide Screen (1981–1982)
 Multi Screen (1982–1989)
 New Wide Screen (1982–1991)
 Tabletop (1983)
 Panorama (1983–1984)
 Super Color (1984)
 Micro Vs System (1984)
 Crystal Screen (1986)
 Ball (reissue) (2010)
 Color Screen (2020–2021)

There were 60 different Game & Watch games produced for sale, one that is still for sale, and one that was only available as a contest prize, making 62 in all. The prize game was given to winners of Nintendo's F-1 Grand Prix tournament, a yellow-cased version of Super Mario Bros. that came in a plastic box modeled after the Disk-kun character Nintendo used to advertise their Famicom Disk System. As only 10,000 units were produced and it was never available for retail sale, the yellow version is considered rare.

The Game & Watch series sold  units worldwide during its first year of release by 1981. The Game & Watch version of Donkey Kong released in 1982 sold  units.

Mario the Juggler, released in 1991, was the last game created in the Game & Watch series.

Headache, released in 1981, is the UK version of Helmet, devoid of the vulgar connotations of the word in Europe. This title is hard to find due to its region isolation and was released under CGL (UK). Headache could arguably be the rarest Game & Watch game.

Judge, released in 1980, features two different colour schemes (purple and green).

Re-releases

The Game & Watch games were renewed between 1995 and 2002 with the Game & Watch Gallery series, five Game & Watch collections released for the Game Boy, Game Boy Color, and Game Boy Advance. They feature the original ports, as well as new, modernized versions starring the Mario series cast.

From 1998 onward, a number of third-party distributors have been licensed to re-release smaller LCD versions of ten separate Game & Watch games which together compose the Nintendo Mini Classics series.

In 2001, Nintendo released Manhole-e bundled with its Nintendo e-Reader systems. Although an entire line of Game & Watch e-Reader cards were planned, they were never released.

Between July 2006 and March 2010, Nintendo produced two Game & Watch Collection cartridges for the Nintendo DS to be released exclusively for Club Nintendo members. The first cartridge featured three games from the Game & Watch Multi Screen series: Oil Panic, Donkey Kong, and Green House. The second compilation, Game & Watch Collection 2, contained Parachute, Octopus, and a new dual-screen game with Parachute on the top screen and Octopus on the bottom. Both cartridges are now available to the general public.

Between July 2009 and April 2010 Nintendo released nine separate Game & Watch ports for DSiWare including remakes of Ball (called Game & Watch: Ball), Flagman (called Game & Watch: Flagman), Manhole (called Game & Watch: Manhole), and Mario's Cement Factory (called Game & Watch: Mario's Cement Factory) among others.

In March 2010, Takara Tomy released officially licensed Game & Watch-styled keychains, based on the Wide Screen series editions of Octopus, Parachute, and Chef. They do not actually run the games, instead just display a demo screen. While the game cannot be played, the speed at which the demo runs can be adjusted. The batteries are recharged with solar panels on the unit.

Ball was rereleased exclusively via Club Nintendo, to celebrate the 30th anniversary of Game & Watch, with the Club Nintendo logo on the back. Unlike the original release, this version includes a mute switch. For members of the Japanese Club Nintendo, after an announcement in November 2009, it was shipped in April 2010 to Platinum members. For members of the North American Club Nintendo, it was available for 1200 coins from February 2011. For members of the European Club Nintendo, it was available for 7500 stars from November 2011.

On September 3, 2020, Nintendo announced a limited run Game & Watch system containing the full NES versions of Super Mario Bros. and Super Mario Bros.: The Lost Levels (known in Japan as Super Mario Bros. 2), along with a variant of Ball with Mario's head (or Luigi's head, with a cheat code) replacing the original character's head, named Game & Watch: Super Mario Bros. It was released on November 13, 2020. Unlike classic Game & Watch consoles, the console instead charges with a USB-C cable.

On June 15, 2021, Nintendo revealed a similar new Game & Watch system, Game & Watch: The Legend of Zelda, would be released in celebration of the franchise's 35th anniversary. The system contains four games; The Legend of Zelda, Zelda II: The Adventure of Link, The Legend of Zelda: Link's Awakening, and a variant of Vermin with Link replacing the original character's head. It was released on November 12, 2021.

Legacy

The Game & Watch made handheld video game consoles vastly popular. Many toy companies followed in the footsteps of Game & Watch, such as Tiger Electronics and their Star Wars themed games.

Nintendo's Game & Watch units were eventually superseded by the original Game Boy. Each Game & Watch was only able to play one game, due to the use of a segmented LCD display being pre-printed with an overlay. The speed and responsiveness of the games was also limited by the time it took the LCD to change state. The Nintendo Entertainment System (NES) controllers were based on the controls in Game & Watch, and Game & Watch Multi Screen version became the model on which the Nintendo DS was based.

The Game & Watch Gallery series recreates the Game & Watch games in video game form, with modes that imitate the LCD displays and modes that modernise the graphics and include Mario characters. Game & Watch games have also been released through DSiWare.

The DS release Cooking Guide: Can't Decide What to Eat?, the player can unlock both A and B versions of the game Chef if they use the timer function.

Nintendo Land for the Wii U has a mini-game named Octopus Dance that is based on the Game & Watch game Octopus.

Game & Wario for the Wii U, a play-on-words of the Game & Watch, heavily references the Game & Watch line, including the ability to play a virtual Game & Watch version of Pyoro, called Bird.

Mr. Game & Watch

The Game & Watch brand is represented in Nintendo's Super Smash Bros. series with the character  First appearing in Super Smash Bros. Melee, the character was redefined and designed to match his presentation as a generic stick figure-styled silhouette in the Game & Watch devices: he moves with limited animation, he is purely two dimensional, his noises only consist of beeps, and his abilities correlate to the presentation in the Game & Watch games. Beyond Super Smash Bros., Mr. Game & Watch has also appeared in Game & Watch Gallery 4, wherein he is the manager of the "classic games" area alongside Mario. He also makes a cameo appearances in Donkey Kong Country Returns and Rhythm Heaven Fever.

In September 2015, Nintendo released a Mr. Game & Watch Amiibo collectible. The design also comes with 3 additional detachable alternatives of the character in different positions and moves. The Amiibo can be scanned into Super Smash Bros. for Nintendo 3DS and Wii U and Super Smash Bros. Ultimate, where it can be used to create a personal CPU that can train and fight using artificial intelligence. The Amiibo can also be used to unlock a cosmetic option for Super Mario Maker.

See also

  (Soviet and Russian Game & Watch clones)
 History of Nintendo

Notes

References

External links

 GAME&WATCH at Nintendo official website (Japanese)

Products introduced in 1980
Dedicated consoles
 
Handheld electronic games
Monochrome video game consoles
Nintendo franchises
Nintendo hardware
Video game franchises
1980s toys
Video game franchises introduced in 1980